Fox Chase station is a SEPTA Regional Rail station in Philadelphia, Pennsylvania. Located near the intersection of Rhawn Street and Rockwell Avenue in the Fox Chase neighborhood, it is the current terminus of the Fox Chase Line. Fox Chase station, which has the largest number of parking spaces of any on the line (342), is the closest regional rail stop Philadelphia's Fox Chase and Bustleton areas, and to Rockledge and Huntingdon Valley in Montgomery County. 

The station has two tracks and passengers board and exit at ground level. There is a wheelchair ramp at the north end of the station, though it requires a request to the train staff to utilize. South of the station, the two tracks merge into one and shortly after, it crosses Oxford Avenue (PA 232) on the line's only grade crossing.

Just north of the station, the now closed portion of the line crosses Rhawn Street at grade and continues into the woods although both tracks are now blocked off with bumper blocks before the road crossing.

SEPTA rebuilt the station area and ticket office in Summer 2010, using funds provided by the American Recovery and Reinvestment Act of 2009. In FY 2017, Fox Chase station was the seventh busiest station in the SEPTA Regional Rail system, with a weekday average of 1,446 boardings and 1,091 alightings.

Station layout

References

External links
 
Current schedule for the SEPTA Fox Chase/Newtown
SEPTA – Fox Chase Station

SEPTA Regional Rail stations
Former Reading Company stations